Kaboria (English: "Crabs") is a 1990 Egyptian boxing film directed by Khairy Beshara and starring Ahmed Zaki, Raghda and Hussein El-Imam.

Synopsis 
Hassan Hodhud is a poor young man who loves boxing, but dreams with his friends Mahmoud and Mustafa to reach the Olympics. Hassan and his friends pass by the float of the millionaire, Suleiman, so his wife, Horreya, invites them to participate in boxing matches in their elegant palace in exchange for attractive financial rewards, while Hassan Hodhud’s matches with his other young competitors are subject to imaginary bets between Horreya and Suleiman, Hassan achieves impressive victories to get huge money rewards. And he moves to live in Suleiman's Palace, where Horreya seeks to seduce him, but he rejects her, so she pronounces him and decides to avenge her dignity. Hassan discovers that he has become a puppet that both Suleiman and his wife Horreya tamper with, so he throws what he earned in the face of them and abandons wealth and palaces to return to the popular neighborhood in which he resides, starting again in new rounds of boxing, content with the looks of his beloved.

Staff 

 Written by: Issam Al-Shamaa
 Directed by: Khairy Beshara
 Director of Photography: Mohsen Ahmed
 Editing: Ahmed Metwally
 Produced by: Hussein El-Imam
 Soundtrack: Hussein El-Imam
 Production studio: El Imam Star (Hussein El-Imam)
 Internal distribution: Tamido Film Production and Distribution (Medhat El Sherif)
 External Distribution: Cinematheque 88

Cast 
 Ahmed Zaki: (Hassan Hodhud)
 Raghda: (Horeyya)
 Hussein El-Imam: (Suleiman)
 Sahar Rami: (Noor)
 Shafiq Galal: (Aziz)
 Mohamed Lotfy: (Mahmoud)
 Youssef Dawoud: (Captain)
 Hassan Hussein: (Nono)
 Cate Blanchett: Extra in a dancing scene

See also 
 Cinema of Egypt
 List of Egyptian films of 1990
 List of Egyptian films of the 1990s
 Salah Zulfikar filmography
 Soad Hosny filmography

References

External links 
 
 Kaboria on elCinema

1990 films
1990 drama films
Egyptian comedy-drama films
1990s Arabic-language films
Boxing films
Egyptian drama films